The Primetime Emmy Award for Outstanding Sound Mixing for a Variety Series or Special is awarded to one television series or special each year. Before 1986, limited series and television movies shot on videotape competed alongside variety series and specials. They would later compete separately for Outstanding Sound Mixing for a Limited Series or Movie. Beginning in 2019, nominations are divided between variety series and specials, proportional to the number of submissions of each.

In the following list, the first titles listed in gold are the winners; those not in gold are nominees, which are listed in alphabetical order. The years given are those in which the ceremonies took place:

Winners and nominations

Outstanding Tape Sound Mixing

1970s

1980s

Outstanding Tape Sound Mixing for a Limited Series or Special

Outstanding Live and Tape Sound Mixing and Sound Effects for a Limited Series or Special

Outstanding Sound Mixing for a Variety Series or Special

1990s

2000s

2010s

2020s

Programs with multiple awards
2 awards
 The Tonight Show Starring Johnny Carson

Programs with multiple nominations

8 nominations
 American Idol

7 nominations
 The Tonight Show Starring Johnny Carson

6 nominations
 Last Week Tonight with John Oliver

5 nominations
 The Voice

4 nominations
 The Tonight Show with Jay Leno

2 nominations
 The Arsenio Hall Show
 Barbara Mandrell and the Mandrell Sisters
 The Daily Show with Jon Stewart
 Dancing with the Stars
 The Late Show with Stephen Colbert

Notes

References

External links
 Academy of Television Arts and Sciences website

Sound Mixing for a Variety Series or Special